HickoryTech Corporation is an integrated communication service provider. The company operates its business under the name of HickoryTech and Enventis through three segments including Fiber and Data, Equipment, and Telecom. The company was founded in 1898 and is headquartered in Mankato, Minnesota. It is a supplier of Smartnet maintenance contracts with its partner, Cisco systems. The company’s telecom segment serves about 13 Minnesota communities and 13 Iowa communities. HickoryTech operates a five-state fiber network spanning 3,250 route miles across Minnesota and into Iowa, North Dakota, South Dakota and Wisconsin and provides communication services to the individual and enterprise customers. In 1997, Enventis became the nation’s 30th largest telephone company after $35.2 million acquisition of 11 Iowa exchange  As of November 2011, the company was listed as NO.83 in the list of America’s Best Small Company by Forbes.

Business 
HickoryTech delivers broadband, internet, digital television and data services while Enventis offers business internet protocol voice, data and video solutions, MPLS networking, data center and other communication systems The name of the company has been unified as Enventis because of brand unification 
Its competitors include Lumos Networks, General Communication, Inc., CenturyLink, Inc., and Cincinnati Bell, Inc. etc.

History 
In 1898, Mankato Citizen’s Telephone Company was founded in Mankato, Minn. Thirty years later, the Federal government seized control of large telephone companies and divided Minnesota: Northwestern Bell and Tri-State. MCTC is the largest of 1,719 independent telephone companies in Minnesota. In 1949, HickoryTech became Minnesota’s largest independent telephone company. In 1985, the company launched as a holding company, parent to five subsidiaries: MCTC, MidComm, Computoservice In., Information and Communication Service Inc., and Mid-Communications Cablevision Inc. HTCO is listed on the NASDAQ in 1995. Four years later, the Company launched DSL high-speed Internet services in Mankato, Minn. In 2013, all the products and services are aligned under one brand, Enventis.

References 

Telecommunications companies established in 1898
Companies listed on the Nasdaq
1898 establishments in Minnesota